Walter Beaman Jones Sr. (August 19, 1913 – September 15, 1992), was an American Democratic politician from the state of North Carolina who served in the United States House of Representatives from 1966 until his death from natural causes in Norfolk, Virginia, in 1992.

Early life and education 
Jones was born in Fayetteville, North Carolina, and attended Elise Academy, in Hemp, North Carolina. He received a Bachelor of Science in 1934 from North Carolina State University in Raleigh.

Career
Jones became a businessman. Soon after graduation he married and started a family.

After getting established in local life, Jones was elected as mayor of Farmville from 1949 to 1953. He was elected to the North Carolina General Assembly from 1955 to 1959, and to the North Carolina State Senate in 1965.

Jones was elected as a Democrat to the 89th United States Congress by special election to fill the vacancy caused by the death of Representative Herbert C. Bonner. He was reelected to the 90th, 91st, 92nd, 93rd, 94th, 95th, 96th, 97th, 98th, 99th, 100th, 101st, and 102nd United States Congresses, serving from February 5, 1966 to September 15, 1992. He was the chairman of the Committee on Merchant Marine and Fisheries from the 97th through 102nd Congresses.

He died in Norfolk, Virginia.  His son Walter B. Jones Jr. served as a Republican congressman in North Carolina from 1995 to 2019.
Walter Sr. is buried in Forest Hills Cemetery in Farmville, North Carolina.

See also
 List of United States Congress members who died in office

References

External links

 

1913 births
1992 deaths
20th-century American politicians
Mayors of places in North Carolina
Democratic Party members of the North Carolina House of Representatives
Democratic Party North Carolina state senators
North Carolina State University alumni
Politicians from Fayetteville, North Carolina
Democratic Party members of the United States House of Representatives from North Carolina
People from Farmville, North Carolina